Autoimmunity Reviews is a bimonthly peer-reviewed medical journal publishing review articles pertaining to autoimmunity. It was established in 2002 and is published by Elsevier. The editors-in-chief are Yehuda Shoenfeld (Tel Aviv University) and M. Eric Gershwin (UC Davis Medical Center). According to the Journal Citation Reports, the journal has a 2016 impact factor of 8.961.

References

External links

Immunology journals
Review journals
Elsevier academic journals
English-language journals
Publications established in 2002